South Hills Junction station is a station on Pittsburgh Regional Transit's light rail network.  This station served as the original "merge point" of the inbound Beechview and Overbrook branches of the light rail system, just before the run under Mount Washington through the Mount Washington Transit Tunnel and into downtown Pittsburgh.  In 1993 the Overbrook (Blue) Line was shut down for complete reconstruction to serve the modern-day light rail cars.  During construction, it was found that a segment of track between the Boggs Ave. stop and South Hills Junction was too narrow for the larger vehicles; this was bypassed with two wide-curved rail ramps built between the Beechview (Red) Line's Palm Garden stop and South Hills Junction where the two branches now merge.

Few local residences are accessible from the station, which functions as a large transit center. In addition to serving as a transfer station for The T, a large number of bus connections are established at the site, including those that travel the South Busway, which travels on the upper level of the station.

History
The station and line were originally established by Pittsburgh Railways in 1904 when the Mount Washington Trolley Tunnel was completed, with the first fare paying passengers on December 4, 1904.

Bus connections
39 Brookline
40 Mt. Washington
41 Bower Hill
43 Bailey
44 Knoxville
48 Arlington
54 North Side-Oakland-South Side
Y1 Large Flyer 
Y45 Baldwin Manor Flyer
Y46 Elizabeth Flyer 
Y47 Curry Flyer
Y49 Prospect Park Flyer 
Freedom Transit Metro Commuter (Saturday only)

References

External links

Port Authority T Stations Listings

Port Authority of Allegheny County stations
Railway stations in the United States opened in 1904
Blue Line (Pittsburgh)
Red Line (Pittsburgh)
Silver Line (Pittsburgh)
South Busway